Connecticut's 116th House of Representatives district elects one member of the Connecticut House of Representatives. It encompasses parts of New Haven and West Haven and has been represented by Democrat Treneé McGee since 2021.

Recent elections

2021 special

2020

2018

2016

2014

2012

References

116